The Human Resources Branch (HRB) is a service within the Federal Bureau of Investigation. The HRB is responsible for all internal human resources needs of the FBI and for conducting the FBI Academy to train new FBI agents.

Leadership
Headed by an FBI executive assistant director, the HRB is responsible to the FBI Director through the associate director. As a unit of the FBI (which is a division of the United States Department of Justice), the HRB is ultimately responsible to the Attorney General of the United States.

The current HRB executive assistant director is Andrew W. Vale, who appointed by FBI Director Christopher A. Wray in April 2017.

Organization
The Human Resources Branch is made up of the following divisions:
FBI Human Resources Division
FBI Security Division
FBI Training Division

References

External links

Federal Bureau of Investigation